Megasurcula condonana is an extinct species of sea snail, a marine gastropod mollusk in the family Pseudomelatomidae, the turrids and allies.

Description
The length of the shell attains 32 mm, its diameter 18.3 mm.

The shell shows a characteristic stout biconic profile and 11-12 strong nodes encircling the body whorl. The Kern River specimens
differ somewhat by having a uniformly lower spire with sutures riding up higher onto preceding whorls so that only the nodes on the body whorl are exposed.

Distribution
Fossils of this marine species have been found in Miocene strata in Oregon and California, USA.

References

 Anderson, Frank Marion (1863-1945) & Bruce Martin 1914. Neocene record in the Temblor basin, California, and Neocene deposits of the San Juan district, San Luis Obispo County. Proceedings of the California Academy of Sciences, series 4, vol. 4, pp. 15–112, pl. 1-10.

External links
 Paleobio database: Megasurcula condonana

condonana
Gastropods described in 1914